Sarah Al-Suhaimi is the first Saudi woman to chair the Saudi Arabian stock exchange (Tadawul), the largest stock market in the Middle East.  She is leading comprehensive efforts to further connect the Saudi capital markets with the global system, in line with Vision 2030.

She was also the CEO and a board director of NCB Capital, the investment arm of the National Commercial Bank, the largest bank in Saudi Arabia. During her years leading NCB Capital, assets under management more than quadrupled, and market share grew in brokerage and corporate finance.

She is now a board member in Saudi Airlines and Saudi Telecom. 

Prior to that, Ms. Al-Suhaimi was the chief investment officer at Jadwa Investment, a leading independent asset management boutique, which she joined in 2007 as head of portfolio management.  She began her investing career in the asset management division of Samba, where she advanced to become a Senior Portfolio Manager, co-managing US$12 billion in local equities.

In 2017, Ms. Al-Suhaimi was named one of "50 people to watch" by Bloomberg Businessweek.

Her father was Jammaz Al-Suhaimi, a former president of the Capital Markets Authority of Saudi Arabia between 2004 and 2006 and former president of the Gulf Bank.

Ms. Al-Suhaimi graduated with highest honors from the accounting program at King Saud University, and completed the General Management Program at Harvard Business School in 2015.

She is a trustee of the IFRS Foundation.

References 

Year of birth missing (living people)
Living people
Saudi Arabian women in business
Saudi Arabian chief executives
King Saud University alumni
Women chief executives